Lithuania competed at the 2016 Summer Paralympics in Rio de Janeiro, Brazil, from 7 to 18 September 2016. They won three medals, two golds and one silver.

Disability classifications

Every participant at the Paralympics has their disability grouped into one of five disability categories; amputation, the condition may be congenital or sustained through injury or illness; cerebral palsy; wheelchair athletes, there is often overlap between this and other categories; visual impairment, including blindness; Les autres, any physical disability that does not fall strictly under one of the other categories, for example dwarfism or multiple sclerosis. Each Paralympic sport then has its own classifications, dependent upon the specific physical demands of competition. Events are given a code, made of numbers and letters, describing the type of event and classification of the athletes competing. Some sports, such as athletics, divide athletes by both the category and severity of their disabilities, other sports, for example swimming, group competitors from different categories together, the only separation being based on the severity of the disability.

Medallists

Athletics

Goalball

Summary

Key:

Men's tournament 
Lithuania's men enter the tournament ranked 1st in the world.
Squad

Preliminary round

Quarterfinal

Semifinal

Final

Judo

Rowing

Qualification Legend: FA=Final A (medal); FB=Final B (non-medal); R=Repechage

Swimming

Men

See also
Lithuania at the 2016 Summer Olympics

References

Nations at the 2016 Summer Paralympics
2016
2016 in Lithuanian sport